This is the complete list of Asian Games medalists in modern pentathlon from 1994 to 2018.

Men

Individual

Team

Relay

Women

Individual

Team

Relay

References

Modern Pentathlon @ Asian Games Preview

External links
International Pentathlon Federation

Modern pentathlon
medalists